is a 2000 Japanese film by Director Kon Ichikawa. It was the 74th film made by Ichikawa.

Plot
A new magistrate (played by Kōji Yakusho) in the town of Horisoto—widely reputed to be the most lawless township in Japan, uses guile and his opponents' own misperceptions and prejudices to defeat his enemies and uproot corruption.

Cast
Kōji Yakusho
Yuko Asano
Bunta Sugawara
Ryudo Uzaki
Tsurutaro Kataoka
Hirotarō Honda as Denkichi
Takashi Miike

Production
The film was planned and written by the Yonki-no-kai, a group of four of Japan's most notable directors: Kon Ichikawa, Masaki Kobayashi, Keisuke Kinoshita, and Akira Kurosawa in 1969.  Financial losses of a previous film in 1970 meant that funds were not available for filming Dora-heita.

Many years later, after the deaths of the other three partners, Ichikawa was able to produce the film. The film includes cinematography by Yukio Isohata and a musical score by Kensaku Tanikawa.

The film was screened at the Berlin Film Festival in 2000 and the Japanese FIlm Festival.

References

External links

See also
 Dora-heita on the Japanese Wikipedia

Films with screenplays by Akira Kurosawa
Films directed by Kon Ichikawa
2000 films
Japanese historical adventure films
2000s Japanese-language films
Films with screenplays by Keisuke Kinoshita
Films with screenplays by Kon Ichikawa
Films with screenplays by Masaki Kobayashi